John R. Smith (July 1837 – April 14, 1921) was an American politician who served as the sixth North Carolina Commissioner of Agriculture.

Smith was born in July 1837. He married twice.

Smith was a Republican. He was appointed superintendent of the State Penitentiary by Governor Daniel Lindsay Russell. He took office on March 7, 1897. Upon uncovering evidence of misconduct, Russell arranged for Smith swap to positions with James M. Mewborne, the commissioner of agriculture. The State Board of Agriculture elected him on December 14, 1897, to succeed Mewborne effective January 1, 1898. At the board's next meeting on June 14, a motion was introduced to deem Smith unfit for office and form a committee to ask for his resignation. After heated debate, the motion was tabled. Smith was succeeded by Samuel L. Patterson in 1899.

Smith died at his home in Goldsboro on April 14, 1921.

References 

 

North Carolina Commissioners of Agriculture
People from Wayne County, North Carolina
1837 births
1921 deaths